Walk, Don't Run is a 1966 film starring Cary Grant. 

Walk, Don't Run may also refer to:

 Walk, Don't Run (album), 1960 debut album of The Ventures
 Walk Don't Run (album), a 1991 Joshua Breakstone album of tunes associated with The Ventures
 "Walk, Don't Run" (instrumental), composed by Johnny Smith in 1954, a 1960 hit for The Ventures
 Walk, Don't Run (soundtrack), the soundtrack for the 1966 film, by Quincy Jones